Koïta or Koita is a surname. Notable people with the surname include:

Amadou Koïta, Malian politician
Assa Koïta (born 1991), French rugby union player
Bengali-Fodé Koita (born 1990), French football player
Morimakan Koïta (born 1990), Malian football player
Moussa Koita (born 1982), French football player
Rizwan Koita (born 1969), Indian businessman
Sékou Koïta (born 1999), Malian football player